Genė Galinytė (born 18 January 1945) is a retired Lithuanian rower who won two European medals in the eights event in 1966 and 1967. In 1967 she graduated from the Lithuanian University of Educational Sciences, and since 1970 worked at the Vilnius City Sports Council.

References

1945 births
Living people
Lithuanian female rowers
Soviet female rowers
European Rowing Championships medalists
Lithuanian University of Educational Sciences alumni